The Angola 40 years Tournament was a women's friendly handball competition held in Luanda, Angola between February 27–1 March 2015, involving the teams of Angola, Brazil, Portugal and a team of juniors and youth players from Angola as Angola B.
It was organised as the host nation preparation to the African Qualification to the 2016 Summer Olympics.

Results

Round robin

Final standing

References

External links
Portuguese Handball Federation Official Website

2015 in handball
2015 in African handball